Di Cocco (also di Cocco and DiCocco) is a surname. Notable people with the name include:

 Caroline Di Cocco, Italian-Canadian politician
 Francesco Di Cocco (1900–1989), Italian painter
 Giampaolo di Cocco (born 1947), Italian artist, architect and writer
 Paul DiCocco Sr. (1924–1989), American mobster associate

See also
 DiCicco, a list of people with a similar surname